Six ships of the Royal Navy have been named HMS Charger.

 was a gun-brig
 was a hulk, formerly HMS Courier and HMS Hermes
 was an 
 was a  that served in the Royal Navy until 1912.
HMS Charger (D27) was an escort aircraft carrier that served in World War II. Built for the US Navy, she briefly served in the Royal Navy as HMS Charger before returning to US service as USS Charger (CVE-30).
 is an  patrol and training vessel.

Royal Navy ship names